SACC may refer to:

 SACC New York, the Swedish-American Chamber of Commerce, New York City, New York, U.S.
 Scotland Against Criminalising Communities, an organisation that campaigns against Britain's terrorism laws
 Selston Arts and Community College, Nottinghamshire, England
 Sexual Assault Care Centre, part of Women's College Hospital, Toronto, Ontario, Canada
 South African Council of Churches
 South Africa Conciliation Committee, 1899–1992
 South American Classification Committee, a committee under the American Ornithologists' Union
 South Asian College Chittagong, a college in Chittagong, Bangladesh
 Southern Africa Cat Council, a cat registry and cat fancy organisation
 Sacc., the author abbreviation of Italian botanist Pier Andrea Saccardo (1845–1920)